The 2001 Atlanta mayoral election occurred on November 6, 2001. Incumbent mayor Bill Campbell, a member of the Democratic Party who had been in office since 1994, was ineligible to run for reelection due to term limits.

Since Franklin received a majority in the general election, no runoff election was held.

Results

References

2001 in Atlanta
2001 Georgia (U.S. state) elections
2001 United States mayoral elections
2001